Welspun India Limited is a textile company based in Mumbai, Maharashtra, India. It is Asia's largest and the 2nd largest terry towel producer in the world It exports more than 94% of its home textiles products to more than 50 countries. It exports more than 68% of its production to US, 23% to Europe and the balance to Middle East, Australia, Mauritius. It supplies to 17 out of the top 30 retail chains in the world.

History
It was incorporated on 17 January 1985, as a Private Limited Company in the name of Welspun Winilon Silk Mills Pvt. Ltd. at Mumbai. It was established to manufacture Polyester filament yarns (PFY) and texturised yarns (PTY). In 1995, the name changed from Welspun Polyester to Welspun India Ltd.

References

External links

Manufacturing companies based in Mumbai
Manufacturing companies established in 1985
Indian companies established in 1985
Welspun Group
Multinational companies headquartered in India
Textile companies based in Maharashtra
1985 establishments in Maharashtra
Companies listed on the National Stock Exchange of India
Companies listed on the Bombay Stock Exchange